Budowo  is a village in the administrative district of Gmina Dębnica Kaszubska, within Słupsk County, Pomeranian Voivodeship, in northern Poland.

For the history of the region, see History of Pomerania.

The village has a population of 829.

References

Budowo